Streptomyces diacarni is a bacterium species from the genus of Streptomyces which was isolated from marine sponges from Sansha in China.

See also 
 List of Streptomyces species

References 

diacarni
Bacteria described in 2019